Vili Bečaj (born 8 September 1967) is a retired Slovenian football midfielder.

References

1967 births
Living people
Slovenian footballers
FC Koper players
NK Svoboda Ljubljana players
ND Gorica players
MNK Izola players
Association football midfielders
Slovenia international footballers